Bell Berghuis (born 13 April 1985, Zürich) is a Dutch snowboarder. She has represented the Netherlands at the 2014 Winter Olympics in Sochi.

References

1985 births
Living people
Dutch female snowboarders
Olympic snowboarders of the Netherlands
Snowboarders at the 2014 Winter Olympics
Sportspeople from Zürich